Spain first participated at the Olympic Games in 1900, and has sent athletes to compete in most Summer Olympic Games since 1920. Spain has also participated in every Winter Olympic Games since 1936. Its team is organised by the Spanish Olympic Committee (COE, Comité Olímpico Español) created in 1924.

Spain withdrew from the 1936 Summer Olympics in Nazi Germany because of the Civil War, and also boycotted the 1956 Games in Melbourne because of the Soviet Union's invasion of Hungary.  The equestrian events in 1956 were held five months earlier in Stockholm, and Spain did participate in those events.

Spain hosted the 1992 Summer Olympics in Barcelona, the home city of then-president of the International Olympic Committee (IOC), Juan Antonio Samaranch.

Spanish athletes have won a total of 174 medals in 33 different sports and the country currently ranks 25th in the all-time Summer Olympics medal count, with sailing as the top medal-producing sport. Five of those medals were won at the Winter Games.

The COE counts one medal more than the IOC because they recognized one won by Pedro José Pidal y Bernaldo de Quirós in live pigeon shooting in the 1900 Summer Olympics, while the IOC doesn't recognize the event as an official one as the winners were given a money award.

Hosted Games 
Spain has hosted the Games on 1 occasion.

Unsuccessful bids

Medal tables

Medals by Summer Games

Medals by Winter Games

Medals by summer sport

Medals by winter sport

List of medalists

Summer Olympics

Winter Olympics

Spanish athletes with most Olympic medals
Only Spanish athletes who achieved 3 or more medals or 2 gold medals are included in the following table.

Summary by sport

Archery

Athletics

Badminton

Basketball

Basque pelota 

Spain is credited with a gold medal in the only appearance of basque pelota as a medal sport at the Olympics in 1900, though the French team (one of only two teams to enter) withdrew shortly before the competition started and so no competition was held.

Boxing

Equestrian

Spain had one competitor in the first equestrian events in 1900, competing in the mail coach event.

Fencing

Spain's 1900 Olympic debut included 1 fencer, Mauricio Álvarez de las Asturias Bohorques, 4th Duke of Gor, who competed in each of the 3 weapons' individual amateur events and reached the semifinals (5th to 8th place) in the sabre.

Football

Handball

Rowing

Spain's 1900 Olympic debut included 5 rowers, a men's single sculler and a men's coxed four team (for which the sculler served as coxswain).

Sailing

Volleyball

See also
 List of flag bearers for Spain at the Olympics
 :Category:Olympic competitors for Spain
 Spain at the Paralympics

References

External links